This is a list of notable events in music that took place in the year 1950.

Specific locations
1950 in British music
1950 in Norwegian music

Specific genres
1950 in country music
1950 in jazz

Events
January 3 – Sam Phillips launches Sun Records at 706 Union Avenue in Memphis, Tennessee.
March 14 – Pablo Casals terminates his recording contract with RCA Records and signs with their chief competitor, Columbia Records.
June 26 – Louis Armstrong records the first American version of C'est si bon with the English lyrics by Jerry Seelen.
August 29 – The first American Music Competition of the Sigma Alpha Iota music fraternity is won by Richard Winslow for Huswifery, a choral composition for women's voices.
August – Herbert Howells' Hymnus Paradisi is premiered at the Three Choirs Festival.
September 24 – Alan Lomax sets sail from the United States for London and spends until 1959 recording in Europe for the Columbia World Library of Folk and Primitive Music.
October 1 – Italian composer Luciano Berio marries American mezzo-soprano Cathy Berberian.
October 11 – On temporary release from Ellis Island pending a deportation decision from U. S. immigration authorities, 20-year-old Friedrich Gulda makes his Carnegie Hall debut.
November – The Eleanor Steber Award is won by soprano Willabelle Underwood.
Johann Sebastian Bach is reburied in St. Thomas Church, Leipzig.
Malcolm Sargent becomes chief conductor of the BBC Symphony Orchestra.
Isaak Dunayevsky is named People's Artist of the USSR.
Mitch Miller signs as A&R man with Columbia Records.
Patti Page becomes the first (and only) artist to have a Number One record on the Pop, R&B and Country charts concurrently.
Al Cernick is signed to Columbia by Mitch Miller, who changes the singer's name to Guy Mitchell.
Columbia Records lures Jo Stafford away from Capitol.
Georgia Gibbs leaves the Majestic label and scores her first charting single with Coral.
Bandleader Les Baxter founds the school of "Outer Space" exotica.
Sam Cooke replaces R. H. Harris as lead singer of The Soul Stirrers.

Albums released
American Folks Songs – Jo Stafford
Auld Lang Syne – Bing Crosby
Autumn in New York – Jo Stafford
Barber Shop Ballads – The Mills Brothers
Blue of the Night – Bing Crosby
The Famous 1938 Carnegie Hall Jazz Concert – Benny Goodman
Christmas Greetings – Bing Crosby
Cole Porter Songs – Bing Crosby
Country Feelin – Dinah Shore
Dedicated to You – Frank Sinatra
Drifting and Dreaming – Bing Crosby
Dulce Patria – Jorge Negrete
Ella Sings Gershwin – Ella Fitzgerald
Frankie Laine – Frankie Laine
Going My Way – Bing Crosby
Historical America in Song – Burl Ives
King Cole Trio – King Cole Trio
King Cole Trio Volume 2 – King Cole Trio
Live at Carnegie Hall – Benny Goodman
Oh! Susanna – Al Jolson
Patti Page – Patti Page
Popular Classics for Four Pianos – Philharmonic Piano Quartet
Porgy and Bess – Various Artists
Sing a Song of Christmas – The Ames Brothers
Sing and Dance with Frank Sinatra – Frank Sinatra
Songs By Gershwin – Bing Crosby
Songs of Faith – Jo Stafford
Songs for Sunday Evening – Jo Stafford
Tea for Two – Doris Day
Two Loves Have I – Frankie Laine
Voice of the Xtabay – Yma Sumac
Young Man with a Horn – Doris Day

No. 1 hit singles
These singles reached the top of Billboard magazine's charts in 1950.

Biggest hit singles
The following songs achieved the highest chart positions
in the limited set of charts available for 1950.

Top hit records

Top R&B hits on record
"Double Crossing Blues" – Johnny Otis with Little Esther & The Robins

Published popular music
"Adelaide's Lament" words and music: Frank Loesser
"African Bolero" m. John Serry Sr.
"American Beauty Rose" w.m. Hal David, Redd Evans & Arthur Altman
"Be My Love" w. Sammy Cahn m. Nicholas Brodszky
"The Best Thing For You" w.m. Irving Berlin
"Blind Date" w.m. Sid Robin
"A Bushel And A Peck" w.m. Frank Loesser
"Candy And Cake" w.m. Bob Merrill
"Chattanoogie Shoe Shine Boy" w.m. Harry Stone & Jack Stapp
"Choo'n Gum" w. Mann Curtis m. Vic Mizzy
"Cold, Cold Heart" w.m. Hank Williams
"The Cry of the Wild Goose" w.m. Terry Gilkyson
"Dearie" w.m. Bob Hilliard & David Mann
 "Domino" w. (Eng) Don Raye (Fr) Jacques Plante m. Louis Ferrari
"Freight Train" w. Paul James & Fred Williams m. trad arr. Elizabeth Cotton
"The French Can-Can Polka" w. Jimmy Kennedy m. Jacques Offenbach
"From This Moment On" w.m. Cole Porter
"Frosty the Snowman" w.m. Steve Nelson & Jack Rollins
"Fugue For Tinhorns" w.m. Frank Loesser
"Get Out Those Old Records" w.m. Carmen Lombardo & John Jacob Loeb
"Gone Fishin'" w.m. Nick Kenny & Charles Kenny
"Guys and Dolls" w.m. Frank Loesser
"Home Cookin"' w.m. Jay Livingston & Ray Evans
"Hoop-Dee-Doo" w. Frank Loesser m. Milton De Lugg
"The Hostess With The Mostes' On The Ball" w.m. Irving Berlin. Introduced by Ethel Merman in the musical Call Me Madam
"I Almost Lost My Mind" w.m. Ivory Joe Hunter
"I Didn't Slip, I Wasn't Pushed, I Fell" w.m. Edward Pola & George Wyle
"I Don't Care If The Sun Don't Shine" w.m. Mack David
 "I Leave My Heart in an English Garden" w.m. Harry Parr-Davies and Christopher Hassall from the musical Dear Miss Phoebe
"I Tawt I Taw a Puddy Tat" w.m. Alan Livingston, Billy May & Warren Foster
"If I Knew You Were Comin' I'd've Baked A Cake" w.m. Al Hoffman, Bob Merrill & Clem Watts
"If I Were A Bell" w.m. Frank Loesser
"I'll Know" w.m. Frank Loesser
"I'll Never Be Free" w.m. Bennie Benjamin & George David Weiss
"I'm Movin' On" w.m. Hank Snow
"It Is No Secret" w.m. Stuart Hamblen
"It's A Lovely Day Today" w.m. Irving Berlin
"I've Never Been In Love Before" w.m. Frank Loesser
"Ivory Rag" Lou Busch, Jack Elliott
"Little White Duck" w.m. Walt Barrows & Bernard Zaritsky
"The Loveliest Night of the Year" w. Paul Francis Webster m. Juventino P. Rosas
"Luck Be a Lady" w.m. Frank Loesser
"Lucky Lucky Lucky Me" Berle, Arnold
"Marry The Man Today" w.m. Frank Loesser
"Marrying For Love" w.m. Irving Berlin
"More I Cannot Wish You" w.m. Frank Loesser
"My Heart Cries For You" w.m. Carl Sigman & Percy Faith
"My Time Of Day" w.m. Frank Loesser
"No Other Love" adaptation from Chopin's Étude No. 3 in E major, Op. 10. w.m. Bob Russell & Paul Weston
"The Old Piano Roll Blues" w.m. Cy Coben
"The Oldest Established" w.m. Frank Loesser
"Orange Colored Sky" w.m. Milton De Lugg & William Stein
"Patricia" w.m. Benny Davis
"(Remember Me) I'm the One Who Loves You" w.m. Stuart Hamblen
"The Roving Kind" adapt. w.m. Jessie Cavanaugh & Arnold Stanton
"Sam's Song" w. Jack Elliott m. Lew Quadling
"Shot Gun Boogie" w.m. Tennessee Ernie Ford
"Silver Bells" w.m. Jay Livingston & Ray Evans. Introduced by Bob Hope in the 1951 Musical film The Lemon Drop Kid.
"Sit Down, You're Rockin' The Boat" w.m. Frank Loesser. Introduced by Stubby Kaye in the musical Guys and Dolls.
"Sixty Minute Man" w.m. Billy Ward & Rose Marks
"Sleigh Ride" w. Mitchell Parish m. Leroy Anderson
"Sue Me" w.m. Frank Loesser
"The Syncopated Clock" w. Mitchell Parish m. Leroy Anderson
"Take Back Your Mink" w.m. Frank Loesser. Introduced by Vivian Blaine in the musical Guys and Dolls.
"The Thing" w.m. Charles R. Grean
"Tzena, Tzena, Tzena" adapt. trad Hebrew w. (Eng) Mitchell Parish m. Issachar Miron & Julius Grossman
"You Don't Have To Be A Baby To Cry" w.m. Bob Merrill & Terry Shand
"You're Just In Love" w.m. Irving Berlin

Classical music

Premieres

Compositions
Hendrik Andriessen – Concerto for Organ and Orchestra
Malcolm Arnold – English Dances for orchestra, Op. 27
Alexander Arutiunian – Concerto for Trumpet and Orchestra
Arno Babajanian – Heroic Ballade
Ernest Bloch – Suite hébraïque 
Karl-Birger Blomdahl – Symphony No. 3 Facetter
Pierre Boulez –
Polyphonie X
Le soleil des eaux, for soprano, chorus and orchestra (second version)
John Cage – String Quartet in Four Parts
Carlos Chávez – Concerto for Violin and Orchestra
Jani Christou – First Symphony
Arnold Cooke – Trio for Violin, Viola and Cello
George Crumb – A Cycle of Greek Lyrics for voice and piano
Henri Dutilleux – Blackbird for piano
Jesús Guridi – String Quartet in A minor
Eivind Groven
Hjalarljod Overture, Op. 38
Piano Concerto, Op. 39a
Karl Amadeus Hartmann – Symphony No. 5 Symphonie Concertante
Hans Henkemans – Concerto for Violin and Orchestra
Vagn Holmboe – Symphony No. 7
Wojciech Kilar – Toccata for piano
Ernst Krenek – Suite for String Trio Parvula Corona Musicalis
Bohuslav Martinů –
Concerto No. 2 for two violins and orchestra
Duo No. 2, for Violin and Viola
Intermezzo for Large Orchestra
Sinfonietta La Jolla, in A major, for piano and chamber orchestra
Trio No. 2, for violin, cello, and piano, in D minor
Luigi Nono – Variazioni canoniche sulla serie dell’op.41 di A. Schönberg, for chamber orchestra
Vincent Persichetti – Divertimento for Band
Allan Pettersson – First Concerto for Strings
Walter Piston – Symphony No.4
Theodor Rogalski – Three Romanian Dances for orchestra
Arnold Schoenberg –
Psalm 130 "De profundis", Op. 50b
Modern Psalm, Op. 50c (unfinished)
Style and Idea (collection of essays and other works, translated by Dika Newlin)
Humphrey Searle – Poem for 22 Strings
John Serry Sr. –
 Eight Accordion Quartet Arrangements
La Culebra, for flute & accordion
African Bolero, for flute & accordion
Karlheinz Stockhausen –
Choral ("Wer uns trug mit Schmerzen in dies Leben"), for a cappella choir, Nr. 1/9 (1950)
Chöre für Doris, for a cappella choir, Nr. 1/11 (1950)
Drei Lieder, for alto voice and chamber orchestra, Nr. 1/10 (1950)
Heitor Villa-Lobos –
 String Quartet No. 12
 Symphony No. 8

Opera
Luigi Dallapiccola – Job
Norman Dello Joio – The Triumph of Saint Joan
Lukas Foss – The Jumping Frog of Calaveras County (opera in two scenes, libretto by Jean Karsavina, premiered on May 18, 1950, at Indiana University)
Vittorio Giannini – The Taming of the Shrew
Gian Carlo Menotti – The Consul

Film
Aram Khachaturian – Secret Mission (1950 film)
Franz Waxman – Sunset Boulevard (film)

Jazz

Musical theatre
 Alive and Kicking – Broadway revue opened at the Winter Garden Theatre on January 17 and ran for 46 performances
 Call Me Madam (Music and Lyrics: Irving Berlin Book: Howard Lindsay and Russel Crouse.) Broadway production opened at the Imperial Theatre on October 12 and ran for 644 performances.
Carousel (Music: Richard Rodgers Lyrics and Book: Oscar Hammerstein II.) London production opened at the Drury Lane Theatre on June 7 and ran for 566 performances.
 Dear Miss Phoebe London production opened at the Phoenix Theatre on October 13 and ran for 283 performances
Guys and Dolls (Music and Lyrics: Frank Loesser Book: Abe Burrows & Jo Swerling). Broadway production opened at the 46th Street Theatre on November 24 and ran for 1200 performances.
The Highwayman Music, Lyrics & Book: Edmond Samuels. Australian production opened at the Kings Theatre, Melbourne on November 18
 Michael Todd's Peep Show Broadway revue opened at Winter Garden Theatre on June 28 and ran for 278 performances.
Out Of This World (Music and Lyrics: Cole Porter Book: Dwight Taylor and Reginald Lawrence) Broadway production opened at the New Century Theatre on December 21 and ran for 157 performances.
Peter Pan Lyrics and Music: Leonard Bernstein. Broadway production opened at the Imperial Theatre on April 24 and ran for 321 performances
 Tickets, Please! Broadway revue opened at the Coronet Theatre on April 27 and ran for 245 performances.

Musical films

Annie Get Your Gun (music and lyrics by Irving Berlin), starring Betty Hutton, Howard Keel, Louis Calhern and Keenan Wynn.
Bhai Bahen, starring Geeta Bali and Bharat Bhushan.
Canzoni per le strade, starring Luciano Taioli and Antonella Lualdi
Cinderella, animated film featuring the voice of Ilene Woods and Verna Felton.
Come Dance with Me featuring Anne Shelton and Anton Karas
Cossacks of the Kuban (Kubanskie kazaki), starring Vladlen Davydov and Marina Ladynina
Fancy Pants starring Bob Hope and Lucille Ball
Hamara Ghar, starring Meena Kumari and Durga Khote
I'll Get By starring June Haver, Gloria DeHaven and Dennis Day, and featuring Harry James.
Mr. Music starring Bing Crosby and featuring Peggy Lee, Groucho Marx and Dorothy Kirsten.
Mussorgsky, starring Aleksandr Borisov
My Blue Heaven, starring Betty Grable and Dan Dailey
Pagan Love Song starring Esther Williams and Howard Keel
Samsaram, starring N. T. Rama Rao, Akkineni Nageswara Rao and Lakshmirajyam
 Singing Guns released February 28 starring Vaughn Monroe, Ella Raines, Walter Brennan and Ward Bond
 Tea For Two starring Doris Day and Gordon MacRae
 There's a Girl in My Heart starring Lee Bowman, Elyse Knox, Gloria Jean and Peggy Ryan
Three Little Words starring Fred Astaire, Red Skelton and Vera Ellen, and featuring Helen Kane dubbing for Debbie Reynolds.
The Chocolate Girl (La petite chocolatière), starring Giselle Pascal, Claude Dauphin and Henri Genès
The Daughter of Rosie O'Grady, starring June Haver and Gordon MacRae
The Toast of New Orleans starring Kathryn Grayson and Mario Lanza
Two Weeks With Love starring Jane Powell, Ricardo Montalbán, Louis Calhern, Debbie Reynolds and Carleton Carpenter.
The West Point Story starring James Cagney, Virginia Mayo, Doris Day and Gordon MacRae

Births

January – February
January 1
Morgan Fisher (Mott the Hoople)
Steve Ripley (The Tractors)
January 3 – Beth Anderson, American composer
January 5 – Chris Stein, guitarist and co-founder of Blondie
January 7 – Juan Gabriel, singer (died 2016)
January 9 – David Johansen, proto-punk singer (New York Dolls)
January 21 – Billy Ocean, singer
January 23
Bill Cunningham, American bass and keyboard player
Luis Alberto Spinetta, "father of Argentine rock" (died 2012)
Danny Federici (E Street Band)
January 26 – Paul Pena, singer, songwriter and guitarist (died 2005)
January 28 – Bob Hay, American singer-songwriter
January 29 – Max Carl, American singer-songwriter, guitarist and keyboard player (Grand Funk Railroad)
February 1 – Mike Campbell, American guitarist, songwriter and producer (Tom Petty and the Heartbreakers and Mudcrutch)
February 2 – Ross Valory, American rock bass player (Journey and The Storm)
February 3 – John Schlitt, American Christian rock singer (Petra and Head East)
February 6 – Natalie Cole, African American singer, daughter of Nat King Cole (died 2015)
February 12 – Steve Hackett, guitarist and composer (Genesis)
February 13 – Peter Gabriel, singer and composer (Genesis)
February 14 – Roger Fisher, American guitarist (Heart and Alias)
February 15 – David Brown, bass guitarist (Santana) (died 2000)
February 16 – Roman Tam, Chinese Cantopop singer (died 2002)
February 19 – Andy Powell, rock guitarist (Wishbone Ash)
February 20 – Walter Becker, jazz rock bass guitarist, songwriter and record producer (Steely Dan) (died 2017)
February 26
 Jonathan Cain, rock musician (Journey)\
 Billy Steinberg, American songwriter (Madonna, The Veronicas, Cyndi Lauper)

March – April
March 2 – Karen Carpenter, singer (died 1983)
March 11 – Katia Labèque, pianist
March 20 – Carl Palmer, drummer (Emerson, Lake & Palmer, Asia)
March 21 – Roger Hodgson (Supertramp)
March 22 – David Golub, pianist and conductor (died 2000)
March 26 – Teddy Pendergrass, singer (died 2010)
March 27
Tony Banks, rock keyboardist (Genesis)
Maria Ewing, operatic soprano (died 2022)
March 28 – Claudio Lolli, Italian novelist, singer and songwriter (died 2018)
April 5 – Agnetha Fältskog, singer (ABBA)
April 12
David Cassidy, singer (died 2017)
Ivar Frounberg, Danish composer and organist
April 22 – Peter Frampton, singer
April 24 – Rob Hyman (The Hooters)
April 25 – Steve Ferrone (Average White Band)

May – June
May 2 – Lou Gramm (Foreigner)
May 3 – Mary Hopkin, singer
May 4 – Darryl Hunt (The Pogues) (died 2022)
May 7 – Prairie Prince, American rock drummer and graphic artist
May 9 – Tom Petersson (Cheap Trick)
May 12 – Billy Squier, singer-songwriter and guitarist
May 13
Stevie Wonder, singer-songwriter and multi-instrumentalist
Danny Kirwan, guitarist (Fleetwood Mac) (died 2018)
May 16 – Ray Condo, singer, saxophonist, and guitarist (died 2004)
May 18 – Mark Mothersbaugh (Devo)
May 22 – Bernie Taupin, lyricist
May 29 – Rebbie Jackson, singer
May 24 – Terry Scott Taylor, record producer
June 1 – Graham Russell (Air Supply)
June 3 – Suzi Quatro, rock singer
June 5
Ronnie Dyson, singer and actor (died 1990)
Michael Monarch (Steppenwolf)
June 19 – Ann Wilson (Heart)
June 21 – Joey Kramer (Aerosmith)

July – August
July 4 – Tonio K, American singer-songwriter
July 5
Huey Lewis, singer and songwriter
Michael Monarch, American guitarist, songwriter, and producer (Steppenwolf, Detective, and World Classic Rockers)
July 10 – Greg Kihn, rock musician, radio personality and novelist.
July 12 – Eric Carr (Kiss) (died 1991)
July 14 – Gwen Guthrie, singer-songwriter (died 1999)
July 18 – Glenn Hughes (Village People) (died 2001)
July 19 – Freddy Moore, singer-songwriter
July 23 – Blair Thornton (Bachman–Turner Overdrive)
August 12 – Kid Creole, singer
August 13 – Pluto Shervington, reggae singer
August 18 – Dennis Elliott (Foreigner)
August 25 – Willy DeVille, singer and songwriter (died 2009)

September – October
September 10 – Joe Perry, guitarist (Aerosmith)
September 14 – Paul Kossoff, guitarist (Free) (died 1976)
September 17 – Fee Waybill rock singer-songwriter (The Tubes)
September 27 – Linda Lewis, singer
October 1 – Elpida, singer
October 2 – Mike Rutherford, musician and songwriter (Genesis)
October 8 – Robert Kool Bell, singer (Kool and The Gang)
October 20 – Tom Petty, rock singer-songwriter and guitarist (died 2017)

November – December
November 1 – Dan Peek (America) (died 2011)
November 11 – Jim Peterik (Ides of March, Survivor)
November 12 – Barbara Fairchild, American singer-songwriter
November 18
Graham Parker, British singer-songwriter
Rudy Sarzo, Cuban-American bass player (Quiet Riot, Whitesnake, Dio, Blue Öyster Cult, Manic Eden, and Queensrÿche)
November 20 – Gary Green (Gentle Giant)
November 21
Marie Bergman, Eurovision singer
Livingston Taylor, singer-songwriter
November 22
Tina Weymouth (Talking Heads)
Steven Van Zandt (aka "Little Steven", "Miami Steve") (E Street Band)
December 1 – Richard Keith [birth name Keith Thibodeaux], American drummer and actor
December 5 – Camarón de la Isla, flamenco singer
December 6 – Joe Hisaishi, Japanese composer and director
December 8 – Dan Hartman, singer-songwriter (died 1994)
December 9 – Joan Armatrading, singer-songwriter
December 20 – Arturo Márquez, composer
December 25 – Rockdrigo González, folk & rock singer-songwriter (died in earthquake 1985)
December 28 – Alex Chilton (Box Tops, Big Star) (died 2010)

Deaths
January 2 – Theophrastos Sakellaridis, Greek composer and conductor (born 1883)
January 13 – Dimitrios Semsis, Greek violinist (born 1883)
January 28 – Kansas Joe McCoy, American blues musician and songwriter (born 1905)
February 10 – Armen Tigranian, Armenian composer (born 1879)
February 26 – Sir Harry Lauder, Scottish singer, comedian and songwriter (born 1870)
February 28 – Ernst Abert Couturier, cornet virtuoso, composer, inventor and instrument manufacturer (born 1869)
March – Kate Carney, English singer and comedian (born 1869)
March 8 – Jaroslav Kocián, violinist, composer and teacher (born 1883)
April 2 – Adolf Wiklund, Swedish composer (born 1879)
April 3 – Kurt Weill, composer in many styles (born 1900)
April 8 – Vaslav Nijinsky, ballet dancer (born 1889/90)
April 23 – Gemma Bellincioni, operatic soprano (born 1864)
April 27 — Karl Straube, German organist (born 1873)
May 7 – Bertha "Chippie" Hill, blues singer and vaudeville performer (born 1905)
May 13 – Pauline de Ahna, operatic soprano (born 1863)
May 27 – Auguste Aramini, French singer (born 1875)
June 9 – Joe Burke, pianist and composer (born 1884)
June 26 – Antonina Nezhdanova, coloratura soprano (born 1873)
July 1 – Émile Jaques-Dalcroze, developer of eurhythmics (born 1865)
July 7 – Fats Navarro, jazz musician (born 1923)
July 11 – Buddy DeSylva, songwriter (born 1895)
July 26 – Papa Charlie McCoy, blues musician (born 1909)
July 30 – Guilhermina Suggia, cellist (born 1885)
August 3 – Georg Høeberg, composer and conductor (born 1872)
August 8 – Nikolai Myaskovsky, Soviet composer and teacher of Polish birth (born 1881)
August 26 – Giuseppe De Luca, operatic baritone (born 1876)
September 5 – Al Killian, trumpeter and bandleader (born 1916)
September 20 – Georges Mager, trumpet player (born 1885)
October 11 – Emil Votoček, chemist, composer and music theorist (born 1862)
October 15 – Clément Doucet, pianist (born 1895)
October 23 – Al Jolson, singer and actor (born 1886)
October 26 – Evelyn Suart, English pianist (born 1881)
November 20 – Francesco Cilea, opera composer (born 1866)
November 23 – Percival Mackey, English pianist, composer and bandleader (born 1894)
December 2 – Dinu Lipatti, Romanian pianist and composer (born 1917; Hodgkin's disease)
December 9 – Georg Hann, operatic bass-baritone (born 1897)
December 22 – Julius Weismann, German composer and conductor (born 1879)
December 26 – Ben Black, songwriter and impresario (born 1889)
December 28 – Charles L. Johnson, composer of ragtime and popular music (born 1876)
December 31 – Charles Koechlin, composer and teacher (born 1867)
date unknown
Jaime de Angulo, ethnomusicologist (born 1887)
Edouard Espinosa, dancer, choreographer and teacher (born 1871)
Cenobio Hernandez, composer (born 1863)
Ray Perry, jazz musician (born 1915)

Notes

 
20th century in music
Music by year